Eric George Chappell (25 September 1933 – 21 April 2022) was an English television comedy writer and playwright who wrote or co-wrote some of the UK's biggest sitcom hits over a more than quarter-century career, first gaining significant notice in the 1970s.

Early life
Chappell was born in Grantham, Lincolnshire, and educated at Grantham boys’ central school. He worked as an auditor for the East Midlands Electricity Board for 22 years beginning in 1951, only becoming a full-time writer in 1973. He had written several novels which were rejected by publishers, before deciding to become a playwright.

Career
Chappell wrote the play The Banana Box, which was given a staged reading at the Hampstead Theatre Club in 1970. A production at the Phoenix Theatre in Leicester in 1971, with Wilfrid Brambell in the role of the  landlord, and was later produced in the West End in 1973, with Leonard Rossiter now in the role. This play later became the basis for sitcom Rising Damp, which aired on ITV from 1974 to 1978 and won the 1978 BAFTA for Best Situation Comedy. The Banana Box had a brief run at the Hudson Guild Theater in New York in 1979. A film version of Rising Damp was released in 1980 and won several Evening Standard British Film Awards, although he admitted the screenplay was based on television scripts.

Chappell's earliest sitcom was The Squirrels (1974–77), an office comedy which ran for three series. Chappell wrote only half of the scripts for the series, these were later remade as Fiddlers Three (1991). His other series included Only When I Laugh, The Bounder, Duty Free, Singles, Haggard, and  Home to Roost.

Chappell married Muriel Elizabeth Taylor in 1959; the couple had two children.

Work

Television
The Squirrels
Rising Damp
Only When I Laugh
Misfits
The Bounder
Duty Free (with Jean Warr)
Home to Roost
Singles (with Jean Warr)
Natural Causes
Haggard
Fiddlers Three

Plays
The Banana Box (basis for Rising Damp)
Dead Reckoning
Double Vision
False Pretences
Father's Day (spin-off of Home to Roost, 2011)
Fiddlers Three
Ground Rules
Haggard (with Michael Green)
Haunted
Haywire
Heatstroke (aka Snakes and Ladders)
It Can Damage Your Health (basis of Only When I Laugh)
Last of the Duty Free
Mixed Feelings
Natural Causes
Passing Strangers
Side Effects
Sitting Tenants
Something's Burning
Summer End
The Night in Question
Theft
Up and Coming
We're Strangers Here
Wife after Death

Film
Rising Damp

References

External links
 Eric Chappell Productions website
 Detailed biography at official Rising Damp web site
 Eric Chappell bio at "Oh...Miss Jones!"
 
 "I Deserve More Than This:  The Work of Eric Chappell", 27 March 2019 by Anna Cale
 

1933 births
2022 deaths
English comedy writers
English television writers
People from Grantham